Carl Emil Christiansen (31 December 1937 – 15 January 2018) was a Danish football (soccer) player, who played 313 games and scored 112 goals for Esbjerg fB in Denmark. He was the top goalscorer of the 1962 Danish football championship, and played two games and scored one goal for the Denmark national football team.

References

External links
Danish national team profile
 Esbjerg fB profile

1937 births
2018 deaths
People from Esbjerg
Danish men's footballers
Esbjerg fB players
Denmark international footballers
Danish football managers
Esbjerg fB managers
Association football forwards
Sportspeople from the Region of Southern Denmark